Scott-Edwards House is a historic home located at West New Brighton, Staten Island, New York.  It was built about 1730 and extensively remodeled in the 1840s in the Greek Revival style.  The original section is a -story, stone structure with a clapboard upper section, originally in the Dutch Colonial style.  The remodeling added a sweeping roof with an overhang supported by seven box columns.  At the rear are two interconnecting frame additions completed about 1900.

It was added to the National Register of Historic Places in 1983.

See also
List of New York City Designated Landmarks in Staten Island
National Register of Historic Places listings in Richmond County, New York

References

Houses on the National Register of Historic Places in Staten Island
Greek Revival architecture in New York City
Greek Revival houses in New York (state)
Houses completed in 1730
New York City Designated Landmarks in Staten Island
West New Brighton, Staten Island